The Love of Marion Bach (German: Die Liebe der Marion Bach) is a 1919 German silent drama film directed by Heinrich Bolten-Baeckers and starring Margarete Neff and Leo Peukert.

Cast
 Lisa Kehm as Sabine Winkelmann 
 Margarete Neff as Marion Bach 
 Leo Peukert as Franz von Tornay 
 Gustav Rudolph as Ernst Winkelmann 
 Hans Stock

References

Bibliography
 Michael Töteberg. Das Ufa-Buch. Zweitausendeins, 1992.

External links

1919 films
Films of the Weimar Republic
German silent feature films
Films directed by Heinrich Bolten-Baeckers
German drama films
1919 drama films
UFA GmbH films
German black-and-white films
Silent drama films
1910s German films